The Arado Ar 195 was a single-engine prototype carrier-based torpedo bomber, built by the German firm Arado for service on the , during World War II.

Design and development
A derivative of the Ar 95, fitted with an arrestor hook and catapult equipment as well as a taller canopy, the Ar 195 was intended as a torpedo bomber to equip Nazi Germany's first aircraft carrier, the Graf Zeppelin, which was named after Graf Ferdinand von Zeppelin, of dirigible fame. Although three prototypes were flown in 1937, the design did not meet the requirements of the specification. It suffered  an excess of drag which was detrimental to its flyability, and so was rejected in favour of the Fieseler Fi 167, which was considered superior.

Operator

 Luftwaffe

Specifications (Ar 195)

See also

References

 

1930s German bomber aircraft
Carrier-based aircraft
Single-engined tractor aircraft
Biplanes
Ar 195
Aircraft first flown in 1937